The PZL 130 Orlik is a Polish turboprop, single engine, two seat trainer aircraft.

Development and design
The Orlik was designed by PZL Warszawa-Okecie as a trainer for the Polish Air Force, intended as a replacement for its PZL-110 Kolibers. It was also designed to meet the US FAR 23 standard. The project was under the supervision of Andrzej Frydrychewicz, head engineer of PZL Warszawa-Okecie. It was fitted with a low-aspect ratio wing to better simulate the handling characteristics of jet fighters. The aircraft was designed to be powered by a Soviet-designed and built Vedeneyev M14Pm radial engine with the intention of replacing it by a modified Polish built Ivchenko AI-14 engine in production aircraft. The first prototype Orlik flew on 12 October 1984, with a second prototype following in December and a third in January 1985.

While the Polish Air Force planned to power its Orliks with locally produced radial engines, PZL planned a turboprop powered version, the PZL-130T Turbo Orlik for export purposes. The third prototype was therefore re-fitted with a 410 kW (550 shp) Pratt & Whitney PT6A-25P turboprop, flying in this form on 13 July 1986, but was destroyed in a crash in January 1987 while being demonstrated to a representative of the Colombian Air Force. Two further turboprop prototypes followed in 1989 and 1990, powered by a Czech-built 560 kW (750 shp) Walter M-601E and a PT6A-25 as the PZL-130TB and PZL-130TP respectively.

In 1990, development of the piston-engined Orlik was abandoned, as the Polish built radial engines gave insufficient power, with Polish interest switching to the M-601 powered PZL-130TB.

Operational history
Deliveries of PZL-130TBs to Poland started in 1994, with the aircraft equipping the Military Pilot Academy at Dęblin and the 60th Training Air Regiment at Radom. All Polish PZL-130TBs were upgraded to the TC-1 standard type, with better ejection seats and avionics.

Variants

PZL-130 Orlik
The original aircraft with one Vedeneyev M14Pm piston engine
PZL-130T Turbo Orlik
Variant with a Pratt & Whitney Canada PT6A-25P turboprop engine
PZL-130TM Orlik
Variant with a Walter M601E turboprop engine
PZL-130TB Orlik
Variant with a Walter M601T turboprop engine
PZL-130TC I Orlik
Variant with added Martin-Baker Mk.11, zero-zero class ejection seats and modernized avionics
PZL-130TC II Orlik (Garmin)
Variant with Pratt & Whitney Canada PT6A-25C turboprop, added winglets, modernized Garmin avionics and changed flight tutor's seat position
PZL-130TC II Orlik (GC)
Variant with glass cockpit and Head-Up Display, company name is Orlik MPT (Multi Purpose Trainer).

Operators

 Polish Air Force
 Polish Navy – Former operator.

Specifications (PZL-130TC II Orlik)

See also

Notes

References
 Lambert, Mark. Jane's All The World's Aircraft 1993–94. Coulsdon, UK:Jane's Data Division, 1993. .
 "Orlik…A Polish Fledgeling". Air International, October 1985, Vol 29 No 4. pp. 167–172. ISSN 0306-5634.
 Taylor, John W. R.  Jane's All The World's Aircraft 1988–89. Coulsdon, UK:Jane's Defence Data, 1988. .
 Taylor, Michael J.H. Brassey's World Aircraft & Systems Directory 1999/2000. London: Brassey's, 1999. .

External links

 List of all PZL-130 trainers used by Polish Air Force

PZL aircraft
1980s Polish military trainer aircraft
Single-engined tractor aircraft
Single-engined turboprop aircraft
Aircraft first flown in 1984